is a Japanese footballer who currently plays for Hokkaido Tokachi Sky Earth.

Career statistics

Club

Notes

References

1996 births
Living people
Japanese footballers
Japanese expatriate footballers
Association football midfielders
Japan Soccer College players
Albirex Niigata Singapore FC players
Hokkaido Tokachi Sky Earth players
Singapore Premier League players
Japanese expatriate sportspeople in Singapore
Expatriate footballers in Singapore